A tram system forms part of the public transport network in Antalya, Turkey.  Currently, a three-line system is operated by Antalya Ulaşım A.Ş.

AntRay

The modern  light rail line Antray opened in December 2009 as a two-way 16-stop line connecting the north of the city to the center. The AntRay line have 16 stops, including two cut-and-cover (underground) stations, and a depot at the northern terminus of Fatih. The tram stations are as follows: Fatih - Kepezaltı  -Ferrokrom - Vakıf Çiftliği - Otogar - Pil Fabrikası - Dokuma - Çallı - Emniyet - Sigorta - Şarampol - Muratpaşa - İsmetpaşa - Doğu Garajı - Burhanettin Onat - Meydan.

In 2015, Transport Ministry’s tender for the extension of the existing tram line to the Airport, Aksu and the Expo 2016 was awarded to Makyol. The project was planned to last 450 days, and to be completed by December 2016, but test runs started on 23 April 2016 with a ceremony, about 300 days before the original deadline. The  from extension Meydan to Expo 2016 has a  branch to the Airport, and has 15 stops. New tram stations are as follows: Kışla - Topçular - Demokrasi - Cırnık - Altınova - Yenigöl - Sinan - Yonca Kavşak - (Havalimanı/Airport) - Pınarlı ANFAŞ - Kurşunlu - Aksu-1 - Aksu-2 - Aksu-3 - EXPO.

The fleet consists of 14 CAF 5-module 100% low-floor Urbos 2 trams supplied for the opening of the Antray line in 2009. In August 2015, the Eurotem, joint venture of South Korea’s Hyundai Rotem and Turkish company Tüvasaş, won an order for 18 new trams, required because of the extension of the tram line.

The project for the construction of new tram line is completed and opened in late 2021. The new line starts from Varsak and follow Main Bus Station (Otogar), Akdeniz University Hospital, Research Hospital and Antalya Museum. Although the line was planned to the current nostalgic tram line, which was planned to renew as double track, no progress has been applied as of late 2021. The whole line is 15 km long.

Heritage tram

Trams runs from Antalya Museum along the main boulevard through the city center at Kale Kapısı, Hadrian's Gate, Karaalioglu Park, and ending on the way to Lara Plajı (Beach) to the east. There are three passing points, but trams by-pass one other at the central Cumhuriyet Meydanı stop and passing point. The tram stations are as follows: Müze - Barbaros - Meslek Lisesi - Selekler - Cumhuriyet Meydanı - Kale Kapısı - Üç Kapılar - Büyükşehir Belediyesi - Işıklar - Zerdalilik.

There are only two tramcars with trailers (out of three available) of MAN and Duewag cars from the 1950-60s. The heritage tramway line and the new light rail line do pass through the same intersection in the city center, however, they do not cross, nor there is a hard rail connection between the two.

References

External links 

 Official site

Transport in Antalya
Tram transport in Turkey
Antalya
Airport rail links in Turkey